The Liga de Fútbol Americano Profesional (Professional American Football League), commonly known simply as LFA, is a professional American football league in Mexico, founded in 2016. Starting with four teams, the LFA has since expanded to eleven members as of 2022. The regular season runs in the spring, from early March to late April. The championship game is called Tazón México (Mexico Bowl), and is currently played on the second Sunday in May. The players are drafted from the country's two college football conferences: ONEFA and CONADEIP and through international drafts, which mainly recruit American players. 

LFA is the top level of professional American football in Mexico, having an alliance with the Canadian Football League (CFL).

History

Background
American football has been played in Mexico since the 1920s and is the fourth most popular sport in the country. The LFA was the brainchild of Juan Carlos Vázquez, a former Fox Sports commentator. Vázquez was a huge fan of the previous American football league in Mexico called Liga Master, and he had always dreamed of creating his own league. In 2015, Vázquez along with Edgar Zapata managed to put together a group of investors who decided to offer football while the NFL, NCAA, ONEFA, and CONADEIP are in the offseason and founded the LFA, which would start two weeks after Super Bowl 50. The LFA would be the first professional American football league in Mexico in 20 years.

First years

2016
Four charter members participated in the inaugural 2016 season: the Eagles, the Raptors, the Mayas, and the Condors. All teams were based in Mexico City. The first game was played on 21 February 2016, between the Raptors and the Mayas, with the Mayas winning the game 34–6. The first title game, the Tazón México (Mexico Bowl), was held on 10 April 2016 between the Mayas and the Raptors. The Mayas won Tazón México I, 29–13. All games were played at the "Palillo" Martínez Stadium in the Magdalena Mixhuca Sports City. The LFA experienced significant financial problems during 2016, with a season average attendance of only 2,000 per game.

League MVP
Marco García, QB Mexico City Mayas

2017
Despite the financial difficulties in 2016, the LFA expanded to six teams in 2017, with the addition of Dinos de Saltillo and Fundidores Monterrey (Spanish for smelters or founders), who took players from the college programs in the ONEFA and CONADEIP. Due to the difficulty of travel, the Dinos nearly canceled going to Tazón México II. In the end, the game was played on April 30, 2017 at Jesús Martínez "Palillo" between the Mayas and the Dinos. The Mayas maintained dominance over the league and won the Tazón México for the second time, 24–18.

On October 28, 2017,  Juan Carlos Vázquez left the presidency of the LFA. The title of President was eliminated and the position of the Commissioner was created, which was occupied by Guillermo Ruiz Burguete

League MVP
Bruno Márquez, QB Mexico City Raptors

2018

On January 16, the newly appointed LFA commissioner, Guillermo Ruiz Burguete, resigned. The league did not announce his replacement. For operational purposes, the activities of the commissioner were absorbed by the president of the board of directors of the league, Óscar Pérez.

During the 2018 season, the Eagles were renamed the Mexicas. In March, the Mexicas generated controversy by refusing to play against the Dinos in Week 3, after a serious knee injury to wide receiver Mubalama Massimango that occurred in Week 1. The Mexicas claim the injury was not properly attended to by the LFA. Although the league recognized that there was an administrative problem with the medical expenses insurance policy, the Mexicas were punished for their actions. The LFA ruled the Dinos game as a forfeit by the Mexicas, and the Mexicas team was fined Mex$657,820.00 (approximately US$32,000) for damages caused to the league, its TV partners, its press partners, the Dinos team, and the fans. Additional, the Mexicas would have to change their franchise for the 2019 season.

On April 22, 2018, the Tazón México was held on a neutral site for the first time, at Estadio Azul. Originally a half-time show was planned, but the band canceled due to recommendation of Civil Protection force. Tazón México III featured the Mexicas and the Raptors, with the Mexicas winning their first title by a shutout of 17–0.

In November 2018, the LFA signed a non-binding Letter of Intent with the Canadian Football League to share resources and to allow for at least one CFL game to be played in Mexico. CFL commissioner Randy Ambroise said of the deal later that he hopes it'll raise the level of competition in the LFA and give Canadian football players another competition to compete in if they get dropped from the CFL. "For so many, if they finish their junior career or college career and they’re not on a CFL roster then there’s kind of nowhere to go and their dream ends, I think that’s a tragedy. This is really about growing the game of football." The CFL later held a draft in January 2019.

League MVP
Ricardo Quintana, QB Mexico City Mexicas

2019

The LFA considered expanding to 10 teams for the 2019 season, with Guadalajara, Puebla, Querétaro and even Tamaulipas among the four possible expansion candidates. However, the league only added two additional franchises: the Osos Toluca (Bears) and the Artilleros Puebla (Artillerymen). A new commissioner was announced, Alejandro Jaimes Trujillo. In January 2019, the CFL held a draft for LFA players, with 27 of the 51 players selected.

On September 4, 2019, the LFA announced plans for expansion for the 2020 season. The newest addition, the Pioneros Querétaro, were not a LFA expansion team in the truest sense. They are an existing team that joined from another league, the Mexican Football League (FAM), where they were crowned champions in their first season. The Pioneros will play their games at the La Pirámide Stadium, which is located in the El Pueblito Sports Unit, in the municipality of Corregidora. But with only one new expansion team, the league had an unbalanced number of teams, presenting difficulty for scheduling.

League MVP
Bruno Márquez, QB Naucalpan Raptors

2020

The LFA decided it would only field 8 teams for the 2020 season, with the Mayas going on hiatus for a year. On March 16, the LFA announced the suspension of the 2020 season due to the COVID-19 pandemic.

2021

On February 16, 2021 the LFA announced that Marco Montes would be the new owner of the Mayas and that the franchise would be relocated to Puebla City.

In 2021, the LFA and Pioneros Querétaro parted ways. 

The 2021 LFA season was once again canceled due to the COVID-19 pandemic.

2022

On February 3, 2022, the Condors CDMX relocated to Querétaro City and changed their name to Gallos Negros.

The 2022 LFA season was the first after a two-year hiatus due to the COVID-19 pandemic. The season featured 7 teams, including new expansion teams Jalisco Reyes and Tijuana Galgos . On March 4, 2022, the Queretaro Gallos Negros defeated the Tijuana Galgos by a score of 33-9 at Estadio Caliente to begin the new season. 

The Saltillo Dinos finished the year with a league-best 5-1 record, suffering their only loss to the Naucalpan Raptors on a 27-28 thriller that featured a game-winning score by QB Bruno Márquez as time expired. However, their success did not translate to the playoffs. 

Despite ending with a 1-5 record, the Queretaro Gallos Negros qualified for the post-season. They proceeded to go on a miraculous playoff run, earning a spot in the Tazón México. Meanwhile, the Monterrey Fundidores defeated the Naucalpan Raptors in the semi-final to become the second team that would compete in the championship.

The fifth edition of the Tazón México was played at Estadio Caliente in Tijuana. The Monterrey Fundidores , led by Martin Maldonado, defeated the Queretaro Gallos Negros by a score of 18–14 to become champions for the first time in franchise history. Fundidores QB Shelton Eppler was named the season's MVP.

2023
Following LFA's return from its two-year inactivity for its 2022 season, competing league Fútbol Americano de México (FAM), which had also returned from inactivity due to the COVID-19 pandemic, announced it was ceasing operations on 30 September following their 2022 season. With its competitor league folding, the following former FAM teams joined LFA, expanding the league to eleven teams: Caudillos de Chihuahua, Jefes de Ciudad Juárez and Reds de la Ciudad de México.

Teams

Former teams

Team timeline

Rules

Game rules
The rules of the game are the same as those of the NFL. Some of the most notable rules are the instant replay reviews, the two-minute warning, the coach's challenge, and the requirement that receivers must have both feet touch the ground in bounds to complete a reception.

Salary cap
Like the NFL, the LFA has a salary cap. With the intention of maintaining sports balance, the League has a salary cap that prevents teams from differentiating each other in terms of the level of players they hire. The salary cap is MX$ 2,000,000, approximately $100,000 . There are four salary levels, each of which is determined by the League and is invariable for any team:

Level 1: foreign players, 5 for each team and 2 Canadians, have the highest salary and bonuses for housing and food.
Level 2: franchise players, an offensive and a defensive, must be Mexican and have the second best salary.
Level 3: starters, 17 to 20 per team, have a lower salary than level 2.
Level 4: depth chart players receive a symbolic bonus.
Level 5: practice squad players receive a bonus only if they get to play.

Season format

Draft
Players must have finished their eligibility in college football before playing professionally. Currently, there are two collegiate leagues, the Liga Mayor ONEFA and the Liga Premier CONADEIP. In these leagues, each player can play five or six years, after which they become eligible for the LFA (they can also declare themselves eligible before finishing their period in college, but it is not usual).

Players coming from college football should express their interest in being hired by the LFA. The LFA gives the list of interested players to their teams and they are classified according to the positions they need and the level of each of the players.

Each year in January, interested players and LFA teams meet in a one-day player draft. Each team can choose a player in each of the seven rounds of the draft. The draft order is determined by each team's record from the previous year; the team that finished with the worst record has the first draft pick, the team with the second worst record has the next pick, and so on. Once all the teams have made their first selection, one round ends and the second begins, until the seventh and final round. There are also complementary rounds in case any team still requires players. The best players are very coveted, so being selected in the first round is considered a great honor, especially if it is the very first selection overall.

Regular season
The regular season consists of 10 games: 6 divisional games (home and away series) and 4 interdivisional games (two away and two home). The season starts on the third weekend of February and ends in April.

Post-season
At the end of the regular season, a direct elimination tournament called postseason or playoffs begins, in which the two best teams of each division face each other in the Division Championship in the home stadium of the team with the better record. The postseason occurs between April and May. The winners of these games go to the Tazón México bowl.

In 2022, when the league decided to have seven teams play, they did away with divisions for the year and expanded the playoff field to six teams total. This gave the top two seeds first round byes and home field advantages for the semifinals. In 2023, when three new teams were added, the playoff format remaining the same with the league's best six teams based on win-loss record would make the playoffs, and there would be no division placement.

Tazón México

The Tazón México (English: Mexico Bowl) is the title game for the LFA that determines the National Champion. The champions of the North Division and the Central Division meet in a neutral stadium. Each edition of the Tazón México is designated with consecutive Roman numerals, similar to the Super Bowl. In certain editions, the name of a company has been added for sponsorship reasons. It is expected that in the future the Tazón México will have a halftime show.
The team with the most championships in the Tazón México is Mayas with two. The team with the most appearances in this event is Raptors with three. The current champion is the Fundidores who defeated the Gallos Negros (the defending champions formerly known as the Condors) in Tazon Mexico V by score of 18-14.

Tazón México Champions

Notable players

Chad "Ochocinco" Johnson , WR Monterrey Fundidores (2017)
Guillermo Villalobos, WR Mexico City Mexicas (2016-active)
Bruno Márquez, QB Mexico City Condors / Naucalpan Raptors (2016-active)
Karrheem Darrington, DB Naucalpan Raptors (2019-2022)
Sergio Schiaffino, DB Saltillo Dinos (2018-active) 
Shelton Eppler, QB Monterrey Fundidores (2022-active)
Omar Cojolum, RB Mexico City Mayas / Saltillo Dinos (2016-active)
Kasey Peters, QB Monterrey Fundidores (2019)

See also
 International Federation of American Football
 Fútbol Americano de México
 Canadian Football League

References

External links
 Official site
 Mexican Federation of American Football
 International Federation of American Football

 

Sports leagues established in 2016
2016 establishments in Mexico
Professional sports leagues in Mexico